This is a list of United Arab Emirates writers, including novelists, short story writers, poets, essayists, and journalists.

Dubai Abulhoul Alfalasi
Afra Atiq
Nasser Al-Dhaheri
Salha Ghabish
Yasser Hareb
Suad Jawad
Salem Al Ketbi
Adel Khozam
Hessa Al Muhairi
Shaykha al-Nakhi
Nadia Al Najjar
Noura al Noman
Salha Obaid
Maryam Saqer Al Qasimi

See also
 "Poetry in the UAE", Shihab Ghanem, United Arab Emirates: a new perspective (2001)

References

Emirati
Emirati culture
Emirati literature

2. https://www.arabianbusiness.com/lists/379374-100-smartest-people-in-the-uae-20noura-al-noman